Nagpur broad-gauge Metro (Marathi: नागपूर ब्रॉड-गेज मेट्रो) is a commuter rail project planned for the city of Nagpur and extending up to adjacent areas of Wardha, Yavatmal, Narkhed, Ramtek, Bhandara, Amravati, Wadsa and Chhindwara (also Nagbhid in the near future) in Vidarbha region of Maharashtra, India. This project will be executed by Maharashtra Metro Rail Corporation Limited.

Detailed Project Report 
A report was prepared by Urban Mass Transit Company. Four routes of approximately 270 km were proposed at the cost of ₹418 crore. Three coach trains will run on Indian Railways' broad gauge tracks at a maximum operating speed of 160 km/h. The passenger capacity of each train is 885. The final detailed project report was submitted in August 2019. The expected ridership of the Metro in 2021 on the various routes is: Wardha 5,669, Narkhed 2,616, Ramtek 3,929 and Bhandara Road 2,556. The total ridership is 14,700. The maximum design speed will be 200 kilometre per hour and the operating speed will be 160 km/hr. The Government of Maharashtra had cleared the proposal for broad gauge metro in March 2019. Railway board, Ministry of Railways under Government of India has approved the DPR in November 2019.

Routes 
The proposed routes are:
 Nagpur - Wardha - Yavatmal
 Nagpur - Wardha - Amravati
 Nagpur - Wardha - Chandrapur
 Nagpur - Bhandara
 Nagpur - Ramtek
 Nagpur - Narkhed

Interchanges will be put in place with phase 1 of Nagpur Metro at Khapri, Nagpur Railway Station and Ajni

Fare 
The minimum fare for distances up to 5 km will be  ₹20 while that above 70 km will be ₹90. Monthly pass tickets will range from  ₹400 to ₹1,800.

See also 

 Nagpur Metro
 Urban rail transit in India

References 

Proposed rapid transit in India
Transport in Nagpur
Proposed public transport in India